Stupak an occupational surname of Jewish (eastern Ashkenazic) and Ukrainian origin, which means "horse mill", or a worker at a horse-powered mill. The name may refer to:

Alex Stupak (born 1980), American chef
Bart Stupak (born 1952), American politician 
Bec Stupak (born 1974), American artist
Bob Stupak (1942–2009), American businessman
Yuliya Stupak (born 1995), Russian cross-country skier

References

See also
 

Ukrainian-language surnames